The  is a public university in Nagaoka, Niigata, Japan. It was established in 1994.

External links

  

Educational institutions established in 1994
Public universities in Japan
Universities and colleges in Niigata Prefecture
Buildings and structures in Nagaoka, Niigata
1994 establishments in Japan